LaGrange Bayou is a bayou located in Walton County, Florida with Freeport, Florida located along its banks. 

It is fed by Four Mile Creek, Ramsey Branch, and Mallet Bayou. 

The LaGrange Bayou flows out to the Choctawhatchee Bay.

References 

 Walton County, Florida